New Brighton (previously North Liscard-Upper Brighton Street; 1973 to 1979) is a Wirral Metropolitan Borough Council ward in the Wallasey Parliamentary constituency.

Councillors

References

Wards of Merseyside
Politics of the Metropolitan Borough of Wirral
Wards of the Metropolitan Borough of Wirral